Adoretus celogaster, is a species of shining leaf chafer found in Sri Lanka.

References 

Rutelinae
Insects of Sri Lanka
Insects described in 1914